Kieran Pratt (born 15 May 1988) is an Australian professional golfer.

Pratt was born in Melbourne. He won several amateur events in Australia before turning professional in 2010.

Pratt joined the Asian Tour in 2011 and won his first title at the start of the 2012 season, the Zaykabar Myanmar Open. He also plays on the PGA Tour of Australasia.

Amateur wins
2009 Dunes Medal, Port Phillip Amateur, Victorian Amateur Championship
2010 Lake Macquarie Amateur

Professional wins (1)

Asian Tour wins (1)

Asian Tour playoff record (1–0)

Team appearances
Amateur
Eisenhower Trophy (representing Australia): 2010
Sloan Morpeth Trophy (representing Australia): 2010 (winners)
Australian Men's Interstate Teams Matches (representing Victoria): 2009 (winners), 2010

References

External links

Australian male golfers
Asian Tour golfers
PGA Tour of Australasia golfers
Golfers from Melbourne
1988 births
Living people